Pontus Holmberg (born 9 March 1999) is a Swedish professional ice hockey player currently playing for the  Toronto Maple Leafs of the National Hockey League (NHL).

Playing career
He made his debut for Växjö Lakers in the Swedish Hockey League (SHL) in 2018, playing two games.

He was drafted 156th overall by the Maple Leafs in the 2018 NHL Entry Draft after the team traded for the opportunity to select him. In the 2020–21 SHL season, the Växjö Lakers were the top team in the regular season. They won the Le Mat Trophy as the playoff winners, with Holmberg as the playoff MVP with seven goals and 14 points in 14 playoff games.

On 4 June 2021, Holmberg was signed by the Maple Leafs to a two-year, entry-level contract. He would remain in the SHL with the Växjö Lakers on loan from Toronto for the 2021–22 season, but after his team's SHL season ended, he played the last six games of the Toronto Marlies season, scoring two goals and four points.  

Holmberg joined the Maple Leafs for training camp before the 2022–23 season. He was considered among the young players who could make the team out of camp. Holmberg was demoted to the Toronto Marlies and played seven games with them before being recalled to the Maple Leafs. He played his first NHL game on 2 November versus the Philadelphia Flyers, and scored his first NHL goal on Vítek Vaněček on 23 November versus the New Jersey Devils in New Jersey.

Career statistics

Regular season and playoffs

International

Awards and honours

References

External links
 

1999 births
Living people
Ice hockey players at the 2022 Winter Olympics
Olympic ice hockey players of Sweden
Sportspeople from Västerås
Swedish ice hockey left wingers
Toronto Maple Leafs draft picks
Toronto Maple Leafs players
Toronto Marlies players
Växjö Lakers players
VIK Västerås HK players